Countdown, also known as Countdown to Final Crisis for its last 24 issues based on the cover, was a comic book limited series published by DC Comics. It debuted on May 9, 2007, directly following the conclusion of the last issue of 52. The series is written primarily by Paul Dini, along with a rotating team of writers and artists.

Countdown consists of 51 issues, numbered in reverse and published weekly for one year. The series covers much of the fictional DC Universe, told in parallel narratives through the interconnecting stories of a cast of characters. It frequently crosses over with other DC titles. Unlike the 52 limited series of the previous year, Countdown is not depicted as taking place in "real time" but presumably operates on the same floating timeline as DC Comics stories in general.

Production history
The series follows the success of 52, which, in contrast, did not cross over with DC's other regular titles. 52 concluded with the revelation that the Multiverse (a storytelling device which posits the existence of alternative realities) exists, and which now serves as a backdrop to several stories in Countdown. Beginning with issue #26, the series trade dress was reworked to identify the series as Countdown to Final Crisis. The stories taking place in Countdown set the stage for the approaching Final Crisis limited series.

Countdown to Final Crisis was originally intended to run from issues #51-0, with issue #0 serving as the prologue to the Final Crisis limited series. Instead, it was decided that Countdown would conclude with issue #1 and the #0 issue was retitled to DC Universe #0. DC Universe #0 was co-written by Grant Morrison and Geoff Johns and served as a summary of recent events within the DC Universe in order to attract new readers before the company launched the Final Crisis limited series.

While the book was billed as leading up to the beginning of DC's Final Crisis limited series, it later emerged that the plotlines in Countdown had diverged from what was written for Final Crisis, leading to continuity problems between the two books, as noted by Final Crisis author Grant Morrison. Much of the comic has subsequently been retconned out of continuity, along with Death of the New Gods. Jimmy Olsen learning Superman's secret identity, the battle between him and Darkseid, and other such events have been ignored following the conclusion of the series. During a DC Nation panel at the 2008 San Diego Comic Con, DC Editor-in-Chief Dan DiDio invited fans to give their own opinions on "what went wrong" with Countdown. DiDio had reportedly described the series (prior to its release) as "52 done right."

Story

Darkseid
On Apokolips, Darkseid and Desaad discuss the coming of a time with existence being recreated with Darkseid as the architect. Darkseid has what appears to be a chess-board with pieces representing the Joker, Donna Troy, Green Arrow, the Flash, Holly Robinson, Batman, Jason Todd, Hawkman, Killer Croc, Martian Manhunter, Superman, Wonder Woman, OMAC, Jimmy Olsen, Nightwing, Duela Dent, and Black Adam. Later, as the New Gods Lightray and Sleez are killed by an unknown, mysterious figure, Darkseid converses with a concubine and Desaad. When the concubine comments on Darkseid showing a moment of weakness, Darkseid kills her and tells Desaad to remove the vocal cords from the next concubine. The conversation is witnessed by Forager of New Genesis, who is spying on them to see if Darkseid is responsible for the recent murders of the New Gods. Forager is attacked by a guard and escapes. The Deep Six are killed soon afterwards by the same mysterious figure. Darkseid shows knowledge of the New Gods dying across the galaxy and the mystery figure killing them, and decides to use the New Gods as pawns in a complex scheme intended to result in his rule of the entire Multiverse. Mary Marvel is brought before Darkseid, who tells her that he wants a sorcerer and that she is it.  Mary narrowly escapes Darkseid's clutches with the help of Desaad, who intervenes just in time to distract the villain after she turns down his offer, causing a brief scuffle between them.  Eclipso assures Darkseid that she will bring Mary back. Darkseid later restores Mary's powers and orders her to capture Jimmy Olsen. Later, Darkseid is about to siphon Jimmy's superpowers from him before his son Orion emerges from a boom tube, apparently killing him after ripping his heart out. The Monitor Solomon places a chess piece of Darkseid onto the Source Wall as a memento of his victory.

Donna Troy, Jason Todd, Kyle Rayner, and Ray Palmer
In New York City, former Robin Jason Todd (now calling himself the "Red Hood") witnesses the murder of Duela Dent at the hands of a rogue Monitor, who claims her presence in this world is not tolerated as she is from an alternate Earth. Jason later meets former Wonder Girl Donna Troy after the other Teen Titans pay their respects at Duela's grave and speculates that the two of them, like Duela, may not belong in this reality either. During the Amazons' attack on Washington, D.C., Jason and Donna discuss the Monitors and the original Monitor and Anti-Monitor when they are attacked by the "Forerunner" who had been sent by the Monitors. Another Monitor arrives to save Jason and Donna from the Forerunners and takes them to safety.

At the funeral of the Flash, Bart Allen, the Monitor tells Jason and Donna that the former Atom, Ray Palmer, is alive and lost somewhere in the Nanoverse, and that locating him is key to surviving the coming crisis. Donna, Jason and the Monitor (nicknamed "Bob" by Jason), meet with current Atom Ryan Choi in Ivy Town to recruit him in the search for Ray Palmer. Searching for him within the microscopic "Nanoverse", they are captured by Queen Belthera, and are later rescued by Kyle Rayner before Ryan Choi is abducted back into Ivy Town. Kyle informs the group that they will have to tour the Multiverse to find Ray Palmer, and they encounter the Authority on Earth-50, a Soviet Superman on Earth-30, and the Crime Society on Earth-3. As they leave Earth-3, they are unexpectedly joined by the Jokester (the Joker's heroic counterpart and father of Duela), passing through Earth-15 and later Earth-8, where Lord Havok and the Extremists capture them before an invasion by Monarch and his newest recruits, the Crime Society gives Jason the opportunity to feign a betrayal, allowing their eventual escape.

Arriving on Earth-12, a universe resembling the Batman Beyond television series, another Monitor who has named himself Nix Uotan arrives, and informs Bob that all the Monitors have taken on names for themselves, such as the Monitor of Earth-8, who now calls himself Solomon. By stating that Ray Palmer lives "a life of no consequence", he unintentionally reveals the location of Ray Palmer and Bob reasons that the only way Nix Uotan could know what Ray is doing is if he was on his Earth. The group then arrive on Earth-51, a near-perfect world where super-crime has long been eradicated. They locate Ray, living the life of his deceased counterpart. Bob is revealed to have been working for Solomon's cause and tells Ray that he must be exterminated. The Challengers attempt to stop Bob, who succeeds in killing the alternate versions of Barry Allen, Ralph Dibny and Jean Loring, but Ray and the Challengers escape. After Monarch descends upon Earth-51, with his Crime Society and Extremists recruits, Kyle and Ray are confronted by Power Ring and alternate versions of Booster Gold and Supergirl, whilst elsewhere Donna faces an alternate version of herself as Jason fights with Gorgon of Earth-8.

Jason is accosted by the Batman of Earth-51, who had eradicated the super-villains of his world following his Jason's murder (as Jason wished that his Batman would have done). Eventually warming to Jason, he gives him a new costume, one that his world's Jason never got the chance to wear, and Jason assumes the mantle of "Red Robin". Meanwhile, Queen Belthera also arrives on Earth-51 and sends her insect armies into the fight, which includes the evil alternate Donna.

After "Dark Donna" is defeated, New Earth's Donna is able to masquerade as her to get close to Belthera, kill her and assume leadership of Belthera's troops by right of conquest. Ray and Kyle are also able to deal with their opponents and Ray explains why his counterpart on Earth-51 was so important: Earth-51's Ray discovered a sentient virus named Morticoccus and had it quarantined. However, when the Multiverse was discovered, Ray theorized that Morticoccus could exist on other Earths and set about using his own superhuman immune system to immunize their populations. After the death of Earth-51's Ray Palmer, the New Earth Ray Palmer found his research and continued his work, leaving an atom symbol on those who he had immunized.

Kyle, Jason, Donna, Ray and the Batman of Earth-51 are reunited as they approach their confrontation with Monarch but encounter a message written in large flaming letters: To Apokolips. Before they decide their next move, the Earth-51 Batman confronts a group of Monarch's soldiers led by the Joker only to be killed by Ultraman. As Jason stops to mourn the loss of the alternate Batman, he finds the Joker laughing amongst the rubble and kills him. The Challengers are then met by Nix Uotan, who explains that the message came from The Source and sends them to Apokolips.

On Apokolips, the Challengers are confused as to why they are there as Palmer says it is not connected to the Great Disaster. Jason tires of their bickering and leaves. Upon seeing Brother Eye, Jason contemplates using it to get back home. While searching for Jason, the Challengers find Mary, Harley, Holly and then Karate Kid, just after Brother Eye removes the Morticoccus virus from him. The group, along with Jason, prepares to confront Brother Eye, who uses a Boom Tube to send them to Apokolips' surface. The group is caught in the shockwave of Apokolips' destruction just as they are about to be attacked by an army of OMACs.

The Challengers, Ray Palmer, Firestorm, Una, Harley, Holly, and Mary Marvel attempt to figure out what to do about Karate Kid, who is dying from the virus. Solomon, the Monitor of Earth-8, arrives and sends everyone back to Earth. Jason leaves the group upon their arrival. Soon after, the group discovers that no one recognizes them, and that their homes and headquarters are not there. The group goes to see Dubbilex for help with Karate Kid, only to learn that he has already died. When Karate Kid's autopsy is performed, Morticoccus is accidentally released, grows and attacks the Challengers. The virus is captured by Rayner and explodes. However, it is discovered that the virus began spreading across the planet before the autopsy, causing infected humans to devolve into animalistic savages and infected animals to gain human-like traits. Una helps Buddy Blank reach his daughter's apartment and the two locate Buddy's daughter, who has been infected by the virus, and his grandson, who is immune. Una dies while protecting Buddy and his grandson from a swarm of rats, and gives Buddy her Legion Flight Ring, which he uses to take him and his grandson to Cadmus's Command D facility. The Challengers leave the reconstituted Earth-51 and return home. After witnessing Darkseid's death, Jason returns to being a solo anti-hero while Donna, Kyle, Ray Palmer and Forager, along with the Monitor Nix Uotan, reform the Challengers and watch over the other Monitors.

Mary Marvel, Holly Robinson, and Harley Quinn
Mary Batson awakens from a coma after the events of The Trials of Shazam! in which she lost her abilities mid-flight due to the death of Shazam, and fell three miles. She seeks Freddy Freeman, who paid her hospital bills, and consults Madame Xanadu, who fails to locate Freddy and warns Mary not to go to Gotham City. Ignoring her, Mary is chased by thugs through the Gotham subway, and finds the former Kahndaqi Embassy, where Black Adam has been hiding. Adam appears, saves Mary, and, following a discussion, transfers his powers to Mary. Mary acquires the powers of Black Adam, Isis, and Osiris as a result.

Soon after getting these powers, she battles a demon composed of stillborns. Mary eventually locates Billy, who explains that he has replaced the wizard Shazam and that Freddy will replace him. Billy scolds Mary for taking Black Adam's powers and Mary protests that she will use them for good. In Gotham City, Mary encounters former super-villain the Riddler at a crime scene. Mary stops Clayface with excessive violence. Riddler suggests she seek a mentor while Eclipso watches with interest.

Mary seeks out Zatanna, who senses a new darkness in Mary. Zatanna brings Mary to her home, Shadowcrest, where she trains her. Mary suffers a sudden mood swing and challenges Zatanna to battle, wielding one of her magic rods. Eclipso observes as Zatanna turns Mary's own lightning against her and banishes her from Shadowcrest.

In the Chinese Market, Mary meets Klarion the Witch Boy, who tries to get some of her power. After Eclipso attempts to corrupt Mary, the Shadowpact take notice of Mary's activities, and attack Mary and Eclipso, who are overwhelmed and escape. Eclipso takes Mary to meet Darkseid, who offers to show her true darkness. Upon observing his treatment of people as mere puppets, Mary attacks him. An interruption by Desaad allows Mary to escape. Eclipso talks Mary into returning to Darkseid and submitting to his authority, suggesting that she can usurp his powers if she grows strong enough. The asteroid on which Mary and Eclipso are standing is destroyed by a stray shot from the Dominators and Monarch's armies. After Eclipso teleports her to safety, Mary blasts Eclipso with her own black diamond after realizing that Eclipso was only interested in selling her to Darkseid as a concubine in exchange for power. Eclipso manages to wrest the diamond from Mary's grasp, and leaves, telling her that she is once again alone. Eclipso then attempts to kill Mary, but finds that she is too strong. During their battle, Mary calls down the lightning, which strikes the two of them, causing Mary to fall into the ocean and wash up on the shores of Themiscyra.

Holly Robinson arrives in Metropolis, hoping to embark on a fresh start. Holly is offered a place to live at a women's shelter, where she meets the reformed Harleen Quinzel. She is outraged to find that the refuge refuses shelter to a single mother and speaks to their leader, Athena, who convinces Holly to go on a quest.

Holly reveals to Harleen that she has been asked to take part in Athena's self-esteem workshop; Harleen is overjoyed at the news. Holly is subjected to a purification ritual in which the women are made to fight one another. Holly and Harley are the only warriors left standing. The two are taken to Themiscyra, and told by Athena that their first test is to out-swim the island's water guardians. The recruits are led through a series of increasingly dangerous obstacles.

Holly and Harley explore a cave outside the confines of the training ground, and discover the cave is being used as a hideout by Hippolyta, who reveals to the two of them that Athena is a fake, and advises them to play along until the truth can be uncovered.

Holly and Harley take Mary Marvel to Hippolyta, who detects that Mary is powerless and that darkness was inside of her. After explaining the situation to her, the three ask for Mary's help. Mary poses as a slave to spy.

The group reveals Granny's identity to the trainees, and after Hippolyta wounds her, she flees to Apokolips, with Mary, Holly, and Harley in pursuit. On Apokolips, Mary, Holly and Harley fight Lashina, Stompa and Mad Harriet of the Female Furies. Lashina and Stompa are defeated while Mad Harriet is accidentally killed by Apokoliptian soldiers. While formulating an escape plan, Mary says she hears the Greek gods. The group manage to free the Greek gods from an Apokoliptian chamber, and Mary regains her powers and previous costume, now with a gray lightning bolt, after saying the magic word "Shazam". At the same time the goddesses Thalia, Muse of Comedy, and Diana, Goddess of the Hunt, grant powers to Harley Quinn and Holly Robinson, respectively. The now empowered group pursue Granny Goodness, who is killed by the God-Killer before their eyes. After returning to their own Earth, Holly and Harley return to Gotham, while Mary returns to her apartment and finds Darkseid waiting for her. Darkseid offers to return Black Adam's powers to her in exchange for bringing him Jimmy Olsen. Mary agrees, and with her restored powers she quickly overcomes the Challengers and captures Jimmy. When the Challengers and the Justice League come to save Jimmy, Mary takes out most of them single-handedly. After the death of Darkseid, Harley and Holly return to Gotham and share an apartment while Mary tracks down Black Adam, hoping to become part of a new Black Marvel Family. Black Adam rejects her and leaves, and Mary declares that she does not need anyone.

Jimmy Olsen

Jimmy Olsen locates the Red Hood, Jason Todd, and interviews him about the death of Duela Dent. Jason suggests that he interviews the Joker in Arkham Asylum. The Joker states that he never had a daughter, and alludes to a larger conspiracy. While calling Lois to inform her of his dead end, Jimmy is attacked by Killer Croc. To Jimmy's surprise, his body stretches, similar to Plastic Man and the Elongated Man, meaning Killer Croc cannot penetrate his skin.

Jimmy displays other powers, such as super-speed. He also has the ability to project spines from his body, but the powers manifest themselves at irregular intervals. Jimmy witnesses the death of the New God Lightray, and dreams of being trapped in the Source Wall. He meets a former minion of Darkseid named Sleez, who is killed before he can reveal anything, although he hears the words "So begins the end." Jimmy resolves to use his new powers to become a superhero and designs a costume and calls himself Mr. Action. He revels in his new popularity, and decides to join the Teen Titans. Titans’ leader Robin begs him to reconsider, as his powers only manifest when he is in danger. Jimmy confronts Clark Kent and reveals he knows Clark is Superman: he pulls away Clark's shirt to reveal Superman's costume. Jimmy tries out for membership in the Justice League, but is deflated when his powers do not manifest.

John Henry Irons tests Jimmy's powers using metahuman biofeedback, but the display generates complicated images of the Source Wall and alternate Earths. On his way home, Jimmy meets two members of Cadmus, who offer their assistance, take him back to their HQ, and run tests on him. Jimmy's powers go haywire, and he runs off to keep himself from hurting anyone. He encounters the Newsboy Legion, who offer him shelter. Jimmy encounters Forager, who asks for help in stopping the killing of the New Gods. On Apokolips, Jimmy and Forager fight Parademons and are overpowered and taken prisoner. The Monitors decide that Jimmy is not meant to control his powers and that he is being manipulated. Jimmy is sent to the slave pits, where his overseers are ordered to torture him; Mister Miracle comes to his aid. Unable to discern the nature of Jimmy's powers with his Mother Box, Mister Miracle gambles by dropping Olsen into a fire pit. Jimmy survives by assuming a turtle-like form. Jimmy locates Forager, who then attacks him. Jimmy duplicates the powers of a Mother Box to restore Forager's sanity. When the two of them are confronted by Bernadeth, Jimmy manages to open a Boom Tube and returns to Earth with Forager, whereupon he kisses her.

Back at Jimmy's apartment, Forager reveals to Jimmy that he is a soul catcher, who is collecting the spirits of the deceased New Gods. Jimmy later sees the words "To Apokolips" daubed on his bathroom cabinet. Before going to Apokolips, Jimmy decides to go and seek the aid of the "Hairies" of the Habitat.

Jimmy travels to Apokolips and decides to confront Darkseid to determine his involvement with what is going on with his manifesting powers. Solomon tells him that he had been turned into a spirit collector by Darkseid, who plans to drain him of all his powers when the time comes. He is then sent back to Earth along with everyone else. Jimmy is later captured by Mary Marvel, who intends to deliver him to Darkseid. Darkseid turns Jimmy's powers off and prepares to absorb them, but is attacked by Superman. As they battle, Mary Marvel fights and defeats Donna, Kyle, Forager, Black Canary, and Vixen. Darkseid reactivates Jimmy's powers to cause him to emit kryptonite radiation to kill Superman. However, Ray Palmer sneaks inside Jimmy and destroys the circuitry that controls his powers before being overcome by its defenses. Jimmy transforms into a scaled giant and prepares to fight Darkseid. Darkseid fights Jimmy across Metropolis and is about to kill him when Ray Palmer emerges from Jimmy's head, having shut down the device inside Jimmy that was storing the essences of the New Gods. A Boom Tube then opens up and Orion, Darkseid's son, emerges. Orion clashes with Darkseid and kills him after ripping Darkseid's heart from his chest. Soon afterwards Jimmy returns home, where his relationship with Forager deteriorates.

Karate Kid and Triplicate Girl
Karate Kid (Val Armorr) fights Batman in the Batcave and is eventually subdued by Black Lightning. He is briefly held by the League, and when he is released is joined by Legion member Triplicate Girl, who now calls herself "Una".

Karate Kid and Una travel to the Oracle's home, where they discover that someone is trying to steal the secret identities of all of the world's superheroes, which Oracle manages to prevent. Oracle learns that the Calculator is behind the plot and defeats him. Karate Kid reveals that he is dying from a virus and only Oracle can help him. After examining Karate Kid, Oracle determines that the virus is either of alien origin, or too advanced to detect. She directs the two to see Elias Orr for more answers. After they have defeated Orr's bodyguard, Equus, Elias directs them to another researcher; he deduces it may be related to the OMAC virus. After the two leave, Orr reports dutifully to Desaad.

Karate Kid and Una meet Professor Buddy Blank, who takes them to see Brother Eye, who is imprisoned within a NORAD storage hangar. Brother Eye confirms that Val is infected with the OMAC virus and refers to the "Great Disaster". He informs Val that there is a similar strain hidden in a bunker beneath Blüdhaven. Traveling through the ruins of Blüdhaven, the group meet Firestorm as Val begins to cough up blood. Sensing something beneath the surface, Val directs Firestorm to blast a hole to the cavern below. Karate Kid and Firestorm take on the Atomic Knights and break into a vault under Blüdhaven to find Professor Stein being tortured by Desaad.

Desaad steals Firestorm's powers and attacks Val and Una. The Atomic Knights arrive and, deploying a device on Desaad, separate Firestorm from Desaad, who then escapes to Apokolips. The Atomic Knights turn their attention to Karate Kid and the others, but are unable to act before Jason and Gehenna re-merge into Firestorm and overpower them. Buddy Blank leads Val, Una, and his grandson deeper underground. Coming upon a sealed door, Karate Kid attempts to open it, which enables Brother Eye to escape the NORAD storage hangar. Converting the people in the hangar into OMACs, Brother Eye assimilates the entire base and breaks free. Upon detecting that the Morticoccus host is in its final gestation, and that the virus' release is imminent, it sets course for Blüdhaven, declaring: "Eye am the Shepherd, Eye am the way".

Brother Eye shields itself from detection and assimilates the remains of Blüdhaven, converting it into its new base. Using Firestorm and the Atomic Knights as power sources, Brother Eye continues to grow. Val, Una, Buddy, and his grandson survive underground, with Val theorizing that they are beneath its notice.

Upon discovering Apokoliptian technology in the bunker, Brother Eye opens a Boom Tube and takes its captives to Apokolips, leaving Professor Blank and his grandson behind. After arriving on Apokolips, Darkseid's Parademons engage the OMACs, who begin to assimilate them. Val and Una wander around Apokolips seeking a means to escape as Val fears Brother Eye desires the virus he carries. However, before they can formulate a plan, Una becomes an OMAC. However, Val is mysteriously able to resist assimilation by Brother Eye, who decides to kill him instead. Jason Todd saves him and suggests killing Una as assimilation is apparently irreversible. Val protests this idea and Todd leaves. Brother Eye tries a second assimilation attempt and fails. Instead, it decides to take Val away and perform an autopsy. Brother Eye then removes the Morticoccus virus from Val, who is then saved by Ray Palmer. Apokolips' destruction and Brother Eye's escape free Una from her transformation into an OMAC. When Solomon sends the Challengers to a recreated Earth-51, Val dies and releases the Morticoccus virus, which infects the entire world. Meanwhile, the Brother Eye of Earth-51 transforms Professor Blank into a modified OMAC with limited free will, enabling him and his grandson Tommy to escape the ruins of Command-D, effectively birthing a new version of Earth A.D. from the original Kamandi series.

Trickster and Piper
The Rogues are reconstituted with a new membership of Heat Wave, Mirror Master, Captain Cold, Abra Kadabra, Weather Wizard, Trickster and Pied Piper, led by Inertia. Several Rogues distrust Trickster and Piper as they have reformed in the past. The Rogues plan to and eventually succeed in, killing the Flash, Bart Allen. Piper and Trickster then go on the run following Bart's murder, but attend his funeral, where they are captured by Multiplex and Deadshot. Eventually escaping, they are later pursued in Gotham City by the Suicide Squad (composed of Deadshot, Bronze Tiger, Plastique and Captain Boomerang, Jr.) and later Oracle's dispatches: the Question and Batwoman, villainous duo Poison Ivy and Deathstroke, and eventually Batman and Wally West himself, on his vendetta against the Rogues who he believes killed his cousin Bart. Piper and Trickster attempt to tell Wally that they overheard Deathstroke's plans to murder the attendees at Black Canary and Green Arrow's wedding, but are internally attacked by Deathstroke's tracking device. Flash manages to remove the explosive implants and brings the two of them to Zatanna's home. Flash confiscates the duo's weapons. However, Trickster and Piper use Zatanna's mummy bodyguard Hassan to create a distraction and escape Black Canary's bachelorette party. They then find himself in the middle of a battle on the wedding day and manage to use the Joker's exploding "present" against Poison Ivy, gaining some measure of revenge over her. As they escape in a stolen car, they are suddenly accosted by Double Down, who had hidden in the back seat. Double Down wants to join the two in their run from the law, mentioning the disappearances of several villains. The group is then attacked by the Suicide Squad. Double Down is defeated and captured, but Piper and Trickster, using Trickster's cloaking field, evade the squad and decide to follow them and free the other villains they have captured. They follow them to a government facility, and manage to free Two-Face. Two-Face tells them that Checkmate is behind the abductions. After flipping his coin, Two-Face declines to join the two. Piper and Trickster continue to flee, escaping capture by Deadshot. They are able to defeat Deadshot, but not before he manages to shoot the Trickster dead. The cord attaching them together detects that Trickster is dead and begins a fail-safe procedure, counting down from twenty-four hours until it detonates. Piper uses his flute to slow the countdown. The train they are on stops for a routine check, causing Piper to flee into the desert. Piper, delirious from the heat, begins to imagine Trickster's corpse is talking to him and removes Trickster's hand from his body to avoid triggering the bomb.

Piper goes through a Boom Tube to Apokolips that opens in front of him after thinking he's seeing the "light at the end of the tunnel". Once on Apokolips, Piper begins to despair, thinking he is in Hell, and contemplates pulling Trickster's hand out of its cuff and killing himself. Piper is stopped by an unknown person before he sets off the bomb. The person reveals himself to be Desaad, who frees Piper from the cord, which is revealed to be based on his technology. Desaad claims Piper is able to channel the Anti-Life Equation in a manner beyond that of a New God. However, before Piper can play the equation on his pipe, Brother Eye finishes assimilating Apokolips. After recovering, Desaad confesses to masterminding Trickster and Piper's ordeal. However, they are attacked by an OMAC, and Piper is captured. Desaad continues to pursue Piper and convinces him to finally play. Piper uses his pipe to kill Desaad and destroy Apokolips (the latter by playing Queen's "The Show Must Go On", knowing it would be the last he would perform), causing Brother Eye to escape when Apokolips explodes. Piper reawakens in Gotham City and decides to become a hero after seeing the Bat-Signal.

Monarch, the Monitors, and Superman-Prime
After Duela Dent's murder, one of the Monitors consults the Source Wall to learn the cause of the rising tension in the Multiverse. The Wall reveals that the "Great Disaster" is the cause of the rising tension and that Ray Palmer is the solution to stopping it. At their headquarters, the Monitors discuss their goal of protecting the Multiverse from individuals who cross between worlds. They vote to decide the fates of Donna Troy, Jason Todd, and Kyle Rayner, and the decision is made to purge them as anomalies. The Monitors dispatch a Forerunner named Viza Aziv to kill Jason Todd and Donna Troy. After beating Jason, Forerunner fights Donna. The encounter is interrupted by one of the Monitors. Created by the Monitors, Forerunner cannot harm them. Having failed in her mission, Forerunner goes into self-imposed exile. Monarch (Nathaniel Adam) witnesses the defeat of the Forerunner. Monarch takes the Forerunner to the Bleed, and recruits her into his army after revealing to her that her people on Earth-34 have been exterminated by Dark Angel at the Monitors' behest.

Monarch and Forerunner approach the Justice League Axis of Earth-10, the Crime Society of Earth-3, and the Extremists of Earth-8 and offers them membership in his army. The Extremists refuse and attack him, but he easily overwhelms them, and captures the "Challengers from Beyond". The Monitors believe Monarch's goal is to cause a war across the Multiverse, resulting in another Crisis that would make him the absolute Monarch of a singular reality. Monarch places Lord Havok in charge of his starfleet; Havok deals a crippling blows to the Dominators of New Earth.

The Monitors agree to eliminate "Bob," the Monitor of New Earth who befriended Jason and Donna. Earth-15's Monitor watches as Donna and Jason leave his Earth, and predicts that when they arrive on the Earth of his overzealous brother, they will be terminated. The overzealous Monitor, who oversees Earth-8, attacks them when they arrive on Earth-8, but succeeds only in killing the Jokester of Earth-3. The Monitor from Earth-8 rallies the others to his cause, listing the threats of Monarch's armies, the deaths of the New Gods, the manipulation of Jimmy Olsen, the virus infecting Karate Kid, and the possibility that a single individual is behind it all as evidence. With the help of a female Monitor named Doctrine, he convinces the others that they must go to war in order to save billions of lives that would otherwise be lost.

The Monitors arrive on Earth-51, shortly after the Challengers escape. The Monitor of Earth-8, now calling himself "Solomon", attempts to absorb Bob into his being, but inadvertently kills him instead. The other Monitors, shocked, then voice their suspicions that Solomon engineered all of the events to his own ends. The Monitors are then interrupted by the arrival of Monarch and his army. As the two sides fight, Monarch approaches Solomon and accuses him of desiring sole dominion over the Multiverse. Solomon returns to the Multiversal nexus where the remaining Monitors condemn his actions before joining the battle on Earth-51. Floating in space, Nix Uotan, the Monitor of Earth-51, watches the battle raging on his Earth before joining the other Monitors. Feeling a call from the Source, he directs Donna, Jason, Kyle, and Ray to Apokolips, and remains behind on Earth-51 to finish his duty.

Superman-Prime, surviving The Sinestro Corps War and now appearing as an adult wearing a black and silver variation of Superman's costume (like the one Superman himself wore when he was resurrected), continues his travels throughout the Multiverse in order to find the perfect universe. Superman-Prime attacks the Lex Luthor of Earth-15, while searching for his perfect universe, which he believes is owed to him. He brings Lex to that Earth's Fortress of Solitude, and kills that world's Superman (Zod) and his pregnant wife and then flies through the Justice League Satellite, killing Luthor and the Justice League members inside the satellite. Expressing his disgust over the League lacking the roster he desires; he returns to Earth and kills the Earth-15 Wonder Woman (Donna) and Batman (Jason). Realizing this is not the perfect Earth he is looking for, Superman-Prime dives through the planet and destroys it. He vows to find his perfect universe even if he has to tear apart the entire Multiverse to do so. Building a secret lair in the Source Wall itself, Superman-Prime captures Mister Mxyzptlk and Annataz Arataz, an evil analogue of Zatanna, and forces them to give him their magic powers as a replacement for the energies he temporarily absorbed from a Guardian. After her torture at Superman-Prime's hands, Annataz experiences a change of heart and, as a way to atone for her past, taunts Superman-Prime until he lets Mxyzptlk escape, facing his tantrums alone. Superman-Prime destroys his base, burns Annataz alive, and flees. Mxyzptlk orders Gsptlsnz, his girlfriend, to seal off the Fifth Dimension. Superman-Prime later travels to the Multiversal nexus where he finds Solomon and demands his aid. Forerunner arrives as Superman-Prime threatens to kill Solomon unless he shows him his perfect universe; Solomon then shows Superman-Prime the war transpiring on Earth-51. Superman-Prime then flies down to Earth-51 and smashes into Monarch's command center. After fighting for a while, Monarch mocks Superman-Prime as a child, causing Superman-Prime to tear a hole in Monarch's containment suit, which sets of a chain reaction that destroys Earth-51 and the surrounding universe. Nix Uotan, the Monitor of Earth-51 and sole survivor of the cataclysm, cries as he finds a sapling emerging from scorched ground.

In the Multiversal nexus, Solomon prepares to kill Forerunner, but is interrupted by the arrival of Darkseid, who, wishing to continue their game, offers Solomon the next move. As they witness Brother Eye assimilating Apokolips, Solomon tells Darkseid that his time is coming to an end. Darkseid reveals that Solomon was responsible for Captain Atom irradiating Blüdhaven, causing his transformation into Monarch. Solomon, disturbed by Darkseid's plans to control the "Fifth World", appears to the Challengers, telling them that Darkseid is too dangerous to attack and sends them away. He deposits them on Nix Uotan's newly recreated Earth-51, where the events of the Great Disaster Unfold. Solomon is later seen in the Multiversal nexus planning to stop Darkseid. Solomon later places a chess piece of Darkseid onto the Source Wall as a memento of his victory and then witnesses Donna Troy, Kyle Rayner, Ray Palmer, and Forager agreeing to act as watchmen for the Monitors at the urging of Nix Uotan, who is impressed by the Challengers selflessness and repulsed by his brethren's lack of foresight.

Related events
Since Countdown attempts to be the backbone to several DC Comics titles, some events and plots play out in different comic book series.

Meanwhile, the Amazons invade Washington, D.C., led by a recently resurrected Hippolyta and Circe. The mini-series concluded with the revelation that the goddess Athena has in fact been defeated and replaced by the Apokoliptian New God Granny Goodness, suggesting that the shelter that Harley Quinn and Holly Robinson are staying in is actually a Female Furies camp.

Tying into the Karate Kid storyline is the Justice League of America/Justice Society of America crossover "The Lightning Saga". The fight between Batman and Karate Kid is shown in both Countdown and Justice League of America. Dawnstar, Starman, Dream Girl, Timber Wolf, and Wildfire are discovered stranded in the 21st century. Initially, it is believed that they came to the present to save Lightning Lad. It is later revealed that the Legion actually came to retrieve a person, the identity of whom is yet unknown, whose "essence" is now stored in one of the Legion's "lightning rod" devices. The Legion then escaped into the future, leaving behind Starman and Karate Kid. An unforeseen consequence of the Legion's actions was the return of Wally West and his family. Brainiac 5 confirms this by implying West's return was a freak accident, but that they still retrieved the correct person the Legion sought.

The final arc of The Flash: The Fastest Man Alive, "Full Throttle", features the Rogues successfully killing Bart Allen, the fourth Flash. Within Countdown, both the buildup to this as well as its aftermath is felt. Bart's funeral is held, and Piper and Trickster are forced on the run from superheroes and villains alike, which also ties into the upcoming Salvation Run. Connecting this story to "The Lightning Saga" is Wally's return to Earth. Wally's new vendetta against the Rogues is witnessed in Countdown where he finally catches up to Piper and Trickster, the remaining Rogues having already been captured in All Flash #1.

Salvation Run, by Bill Willingham, Lilah Sturges and Sean Chen, is the story of various supervillains who have been captured and deported via Boom Tube technology to another planet. Regarding Countdown, Newsarama asked writer Willingham "Just to try and point out an example of this in action, would it be safe to say that Pied Piper and Trickster would have found themselves on this world had they not escaped capture in Countdown?", to which the response was "That's a fairly safe guess." The Suicide Squad, behind the attempted captures of Piper and Trickster were also shown to have captured other Rogues in All-Flash #1 who are pictured on the cover for issue #1. In Countdown, after escaping Suicide Squad member Deadshot, Piper and Trickster later evade capture from four other members in Gotham City. Among those captured in the limited series include Lex Luthor, Scandal Savage, and the Joker, and the title refers to the planned escape from the planet as led by Luthor.

As well as playing a prominent part in Countdown, the story thread centering on the Death of the New Gods is playing out in other books. Outsiders: Five of a Kind: Week Three: Thunder/Martian Manhunter featured the deaths of New Gods Grayven and Speed Queen at the hands of a mysterious God-Killer, while the New God Knockout was killed in Birds of Prey #109. This appears to be leading into the Death of the New Gods limited series written and drawn by Jim Starlin, which saw the demise of all of the characters created by Jack Kirby for his "Fourth World" metaseries. After the conclusion of the Death of the New Gods limited series, DC editorial revealed that the "Fourth World" concept would be replaced by a "Fifth World" concept some time in the future.

In Captain Carrot and the Final Ark (October 2007), written by Bill Morrison, with art by co-creator Scott Shaw, the Zoo Crew reunite in the midst of growing strife between the land and the sea creatures of Earth-26, sparked by Starro. Unfortunately, they encounter Starro and most of their powers are neutralized, except for Pig-Iron. Furthermore, that Earth is rendered uninhabitable, and the Crew has an ocean liner loaded with refugees transported off the planet by the Just'a Lotta Animals. Unfortunately, the ship is accidentally sent to New Earth. Although the Justice League encounter the ship and land it safely, all the passengers, including the Crew, are transformed into their animal forms indigenous to that Earth and, although they all apparently still have their human level intelligence, they are unable to speak. However, some time in the future, the Crew will discover that their forms and powers have been restored. In Final Crisis #7, Captain Carrot is seen in the climactic battle with his "humanity" and powers restored, and Pig-Iron is with him.

Secondary titles
Countdown: Arena was a four-part series featuring Monarch organizing a battle tournament between the heroes of the 52 universes, in order to determine who will be worthy of joining his army.

Countdown to Adventure follows the adventures of Starfire, Animal Man and Adam Strange after their return home in 52. Starfire and Animal Man continue with life on Earth, although their powers are not entirely reliable despite ample time to readjust to Earth's environment, while Adam Strange is replaced as the guardian of the planet Rann by an ultra-violent Hollywood actor named Champ Hazard. Meanwhile, the return of Lady Styx is heralded on Earth and Rann by zombie-like outbursts of three words: "Believe in her." Backup stories within Countdown to Adventure feature Forerunner and Monarch and expand upon both her origin story and her journey through the Multiverse, including an alternate history version of the Justice League had the Nazi's won World War 2 with the JLA being organized by Hitler.

Countdown to Mystery features the adventures of Kent V. Nelson becoming Doctor Fate. In a backup story, Eclipso seduces the heroes of the DC Universe, tying into Countdown appearances with Mary Marvel and begins with the corruption of Plastic Man and Darkseid's revelation that he is Eclipso's true creator and that Eclipso's black diamond was mined on the planet Apokolips.

The Countdown Presents: The Search for Ray Palmer one-shots expand on the Challengers' quest to find former Atom Ray Palmer.

Countdown Presents: Lord Havok and the Extremists concerns events on Earth-8 and how they impact the future of the Multiverse and the Countdown to Final Crisis limited series.

Promotional campaign
At the New York Comic Con in 2007, DC distributed four pins, with the option of a fifth, promoting storylines in Countdown. The first four pins say: "WWMMD?" ("What Would Mary Marvel Do?"), "I Found Ray Palmer", "Look to the Skies!" and "Jimmy Olsen Must Die!". The final pin says, "Darkseid Rules!"

A teaser poster was released, which shows Wonder Woman comforting Superman, Batman in a different costume (with a sword and what appears to be chain mail armor) and Donna Troy wearing her Wonder Girl costume again. Kyle Rayner is wearing a yellow ring, and Mary Marvel is shown partially in shadow. Mister Miracle stands next to Big Barda. Also notable among the poster is a Legion flight ring, a minuscule red hand (the Atom's) sticking out of the rubble, and the bodies of Blue Beetle (Ted Kord), Maxwell Lord, The Question (Vic Sage), and Jade — major or notable heroes who had recently died. The heroes are gathered around the head of the Statue of Liberty; the headless body of the statue can be seen in the background.

While alternately revealing and retracting his statements about Jason Todd being the new Red Robin, Dan DiDio confirmed the latter within the pages of DC Comics as of July 2007. DiDio had also previously mentioned that Barry Allen would be the returning Flash.

In later interviews, Dan DiDio finally explained the symbolism of the image in light of the fact that a second was soon to be released.

Released with books published on July 5, 2007, in the DC Nation: #68 column, DiDio described the picture's symbolism: "Anyone standing on barren ground is doomed. In this case, it spells the Death of the New Gods...The yellow ring corrupts Kyle (Rayner) in The Sinestro Corps War...Jason Todd becomes Red Robin, driving a wedge in the Challengers from Beyond...Green Arrow struggles to win the love of Black Canary...Batman, in symbolic garb, wields the sword that hearkens the return of a deadly foe (Ra's al Ghul)...Dressed in Barry's costume, Bart (Allen, the Flash) showed that he had one foot in the grave...A Legionnaire is lost and marked for death in Countdown...The Atom, lost, struggles to survive...The shield marked Hippolyta's return...Superman and Wonder Woman discuss parent issues...Is that a Boom Tube I see, and can that be the path to salvation?...The shadow of evil falls over Mary Marvel...and the statue head, reminiscent of and tied to Kamandi #1, also reflects Sinestro's upcoming visit to the Big Apple."

A second teaser image was released by DC comics to the website Newsarama.com. Drawn by Ethan Van Sciver with the caption "...And Evil Shall Inherit The Earth". It depicts various DC characters and Dan DiDio states that it '...will get us to the end of Countdown.'

A series of promotional posters highlighting the main characters in Countdown was released over several months. They also appeared as full paged ads in several comic books and several issues of Wizard magazine. These include:
 Eclipso extending a hand to Mary Marvel and a message that reads "Seduction of the Innocent".
 An angry Ray Palmer under a magnifying glass with the message "I Found Ray Palmer!".
 Jimmy Olsen looking up from the bottom of the poster with the message "Jimmy Olsen Must Die!"
 The hands of the Trickster and the Pied Piper handcuffed together, reading "Villains Defiant!"
 Darkseid's face with the message "Unto Man Shall Come... A Great Disaster".

A series of in-house ads ran through DC's comic books based on the pins and posters. All of them were illustrated by Ryan Sook. These include:
 Eclipso wearing a "What Would Mary Marvel Do?" button.
 Red Robin wearing an "I Found Ray Palmer!" button.
 The Joker wearing a "Jimmy Olsen Must Die" Button on his lapel. Another image has the Joker grinning while wearing Jimmy's press pass, his bowtie, and his Superman signal watch.
 Granny Goodness wearing a "Darkseid Rules!" button.
 Superman wearing a "Look to the Skies!" button.

A series of in-house ads for series undergoing revamps also appeared. These ads incorporated the series' title as a partial crumbling stone block on a white background and the tagline "The Countdown continues". All of them were illustrated by Ryan Sook.

Reception

Critical reaction

The book was critically panned by IGN as being one of the worst event comics ever.

Sales figures
Sales of Countdown began with issue #51 selling 91,054 orders from Diamond Comics Distributors, making it the nineteenth best-selling comic book in May 2007. After the first issue, sales steadily dropped to a low of 72,077 copies with issue #40. Sales of subsequent issues briefly jumped to a high of approximately 88,000 copies per issue, before gradually declining into the 67,000 range.

In other media
In 2010 GraphicAudio produced an audiobook based on Countdown, written by Greg Cox. It runs for 8 hours. It excludes the plots of: Karate Kid and Triplicate Girl, the Morticoccus, Trickster and Pied Piper, Ryan Choi, Monarch, Superboy-Prime, Kyle Rayner, Duela Dent, Belthera, Klarion, Steel, Kamandi and Brother Eye, as well as other elements, such as merging Monitors Bob and Solomon into one being, omitting the destruction of Earth-51 and having the Infinity Man battling Darkseid in the final battle instead of Orion.

Collected editions
The series has been collected into four trade paperbacks:

Volume 1 (collects #51-39, 296 pages, May 2008)
Volume 2 (collects #38-26, 296 pages, July 2008)
Volume 3 (collects #25-13, 296 pages, October 2008)
Volume 4 (collects #12-1, 272 pages, November 2008)

Other connected collections include:

Countdown: Arena #1-4 (168 pages, August 2008, DC Comics, Titan Books)
Countdown to Adventure #1-8 (192 pages, August 2008, DC Comics, Titan Books)
Countdown to Mystery #1-8 (160 pages, September 2008, DC Comics)
Countdown Presents: The Search for Ray Palmer Crime Society #1; Gotham by Gaslight #1; Red Rain #1; Red Son #1; Superwoman/Batwoman #1; Wildstorm #1 (168 pages, July 2008, DC Comics, Titan Books)
Countdown Presents: Lord Havok & the Extremists 1-6 (144 pages, September 2008, Titan Books, October 2008)
 Captain Carrot and the Final Ark #1-3
 Outsiders: Five of a Kind Nightwing/Boomerang #1; Katana/Shazam #2; Martian Manhunter/Thunder #3; Metamorpho/Aquaman #4; Wonder Woman/Grace #5
 Countdown Special: Eclipso #1; Jimmy Olsen #1; Kamandi #1; OMAC #1; The Atom #1-2; The Flash #1; The New Gods #1
 Action Comics #852-854 
 The All New Atom #14-15
 Detective Comics #837
 Supergirl #21-22
 Superman #665 
 Teen Titans #47

References

External links
 Myspace Comics Previews of #51 and #50

2007 comics debuts
2008 comics endings
Comics by Keith Giffen
Comics by Paul Dini
Defunct American comics
Comics about parallel universes